The Miami Conservancy District is a river management agency operating in Southwest Ohio to control flooding of the Great Miami River and its tributaries.  It was organized in 1915 following the catastrophic Great Dayton Flood of the Great Miami River in March 1913, which hit Dayton, Ohio particularly hard.  Designed by Arthur Ernest Morgan, the Miami Conservancy District built levees, straightened the river channel throughout the Miami Valley, and built five dry dams on various tributaries to control flooding.  The district and its projects are unusual in that they were funded almost entirely by local tax initiatives, unlike similar projects elsewhere which were funded by the federal government and coordinated by the U.S. Army Corps of Engineers.

Historical perspective

The 1913 flood has been ascribed in part to the 1912 eruption of Mount Katmai and its daughter volcano Novarupta in Alaska. In one of the greatest recorded volcanic events, Novarupta emitted enough fine ash into the atmosphere to block sunlight and cool the climate of the Northern Hemisphere that winter.

The success of the Miami Conservancy District helped to inspire the development of the much larger Tennessee Valley Authority during the Great Depression. The district was designated as a National Historic Civil Engineering Landmark by the American Society of Civil Engineers in 1972.

Dams

The district manages five dry dams. They are hydraulic fill dams constructed from 1919 to 1922 using fill trestles.

Englewood Dam

Located near Englewood, Englewood dam is the largest of the dams maintained by the district. It regulates the flow of the Stillwater River into the Great Miami River. U.S. Route 40 crosses the top of the dam. It was constructed in 1919 and consists of as much earth as the Great Pyramid of Giza.

Germantown Dam
Located near Germantown, Germantown Dam regulates the flow of Twin Creek into the Great Miami River. It was constructed in 1920.

Huffman Dam

Located near Fairborn, Huffman Dam regulates the flow of the Mad River into the Great Miami River.

Lockington Dam

Located north of Piqua outside the village of Lockington, Lockington dam regulates the flow of Loramie Creek into the Great Miami River. It was constructed in 1919.

Taylorsville Dam

Located near Vandalia, Taylorsville Dam regulates the Great Miami River. When full, the dam would inundate  (39 km²). It was constructed in 1919.

Recreation
The Miami Conservancy District (MCD) actively promotes and develops recreational amenities throughout the Great Miami River Watershed. MCD owns and/or maintains an extensive recreation trail system (nearly 34 miles) throughout Montgomery County. The trail system is part of a network of 340 miles of multi-use, paved path that connect Dayton east to Xenia and near Chillicothe and London, south to Franklin, west to near Greenville, and north to Piqua.

MCD maintains several boat ramps to encourage recreation on the Great Miami River Watershed waterways. MCD also offers river recreation maps to the Great Miami, Mad and Stillwater rivers which make up the national and state-designated Great Miami River Watershed Water Trail – the largest water trail system in Ohio. The trail collectively offers 291 miles of waterway accessible to recreational boaters, fishermen and wildlife watchers.

Low dams: MCD owns three low dams. Only Two-mile Dam in Hamilton is part of the flood protection system. The other low dams create a pool of water upstream of each dam for recreation, including boating and fishing. The cities of Hamilton, West Carrollton, and Moraine, pay an assessment for MCD to maintain the recreational dams.

RiverWalk: The Dayton RiverWalk runs along the levee-top between the Main Street Bridge and the Monument Avenue (Dayton View) Bridge on each side of the Great Miami River. The total length of the lighted, crushed gravel walkway loop, including the two bridges, is about 1 mile. The walkway is easily accessible from the end of either bridge.

All of these projects were constructed and are maintained by funds separate from flood protection or groundwater assessments. Assessments to cities – as well as grants and other revenue sources – pay for the construction and maintenance of MCD recreation amenities.

References

External links
Miami Conservancy District Homepage
The Miami Valley and the 1913 Flood, State of Ohio, Miami Conservancy District, Arthur E. Morgan, Chief Engineer, Technical Reports Part I, 1917
What a Dam Sight (Geocaching.com)
Miami Conservancy District (ASCE)

Greene County, Ohio
Miami County, Ohio
Montgomery County, Ohio
Shelby County, Ohio
Warren County, Ohio
Dams in Ohio
Historic Civil Engineering Landmarks